Ninham is a hamlet on the Isle of Wight in the parish of Newchurch, and about  2 miles (3.3 km) away from Shanklin, the nearest tourist town. It is about 7 miles (12 km) away from Newport, the island's capital. It is the location of Ninham Farm and it is also the location of Ninham Country Holidays, a campsite

References

Villages on the Isle of Wight